is a Japanese actor, voice actor, singer-songwriter, theatre director and sound director. He used to be employed by the talent management firm 81 Produce, but today he is freelance. He is often mixed up with Tomomichi Nishimura.

Since 2003, Nishimura has been the representative of OMO Ltd., being involved in various activities as a sound director for games, OVAs and CD dramas.

Filmography

Television animation
 Urusei Yatsura (1981–1986) (Kotatsu Kitty)
 Itadakiman (1983) (Hatsuo)
 Zillion (1987) (Bō)
 Berserk (1997) (Corkus)
 Alice SOS (1998) (Namekuji-neko)
 Trigun (1998) (Midvalley the Hornfreak)
 Magic User's Club (1999) (Yoshito Yoshimoto)
 Baki the Grappler (2001) (Chiharu Shiba)
 I Love Bubu Chacha (2001) (Nick)
 Astro Boy: Mighty Atom (2003) (Jiomini)
 Gokusen (2004) (Principal Gonzō Shirakawa)
 Nerima Daikon Brothers (2006) (Attorney Kakuhama)
 Saru Get You -On Air- (2006) (Pipotron Red, Ukki White)
 Kaiji: Ultimate Survivor (2007) (Okabayashi)
 Juni Taisen (2017) (Michio Tsukui)

Unknown date
 Ayakashi Ayashi (Hanai Toraichi)
 Cats & Company (Hector)
 Corrector Yui (IR)
 Death Note (Matt/Mail Jeevas, Takuo Shibuimaru)
 Detective Conan (Director, Asakichi Yagura, Jiei Kariya, Takeshi Nezu, Jōji Narugawa)
 Digimon Frontier (Grottomon)
 Fushigi Mahou Fun Fun Pharmacy (Uomasa, Used Bookstore Owner, Summer Spirit)
 Futari wa Pretty Cure/Futari wa Pretty Cure Max Heart  (Vice Principal Kometsuki)
 Hamtaro (Sabu)
 Haō Taikei Ryū Knight (Sarutobi)
 Harimogu Hārī (Takuya)
 High School! Kimengumi (Munaita Dan, Kurutsu Teru)
 Hunter × Hunter (Kiriko, Progressive,Seaquant)
 Kaleido Star (Simon Park)
 Karaoke Senshi Mike-jirō (Principal Doheta, mike goblin, Spielberger)
 Kindaichi Case Files (Yukio Nijigawa, Naoya Tateishi)
 Kinnikuman Nisei (Tel Tel Boy)
 Korokke! (Bavarois)
 Kuma no Pūtarō (Karaoke Monkey)
 Macross 7 (Gigile)
 Rockman EXE Beast (Nenji Rokushakudama)
 Rockman EXE Stream (Nenji Rokushakudama)
 Momotarō Densetsu (Kumagorō)
 Monster (Terrorist "Secretary")
 Nangoku Shōnen Papuwa-kun (Tanno-kun (2nd voice))
 Petite Princess Yucie (Balizan)
 Pokémon (Torigai)
 Pokémon: Advanced Generation (Professor Soraishi)
 Silk Road Shōnen Yūto (Arumajirō)
 Soreike! Anpanman (SLman (2nd voice))
 Teenage Mutant Ninja Turtles (Mack)
 Tove Jasson no Tanoshii Mūmin Ikka (Busutafu)
 Yoroiden Samurai Troopers (Shu Rei Fuan)
 Rurouni Kenshin (Kaita)
 Yu-Gi-Oh! GX (Zure)

Original video animation (OVA)
Haou Taikei Ryū Knight: Adeu's Legend (xxxx) (Sarutobi, Kazemaru)
Inferious Wakusei Senshi Gaiden Condition Green (xxxx) (Edward T. McCragan)
Macross Plus (1994) (Yan Noiman)
Saber Marionette (xxxx) (Hess)
Twin Angels (1995) (Dekunobo)
Samurai Troopers Gaiden (xxxx) (Shu Rei Fuan)
Samurai Troopers: Legend of Kikoutei (xxxx) (Shu Rei Fuan)
Samurai Troopers: Message (xxxx) (Shu Rei Fuan)
Urotsukidōji (1987) (Amano Jyaku)
Ultraman: Super Fighter Legend (1996) (Ultraman Ace and Gomora)
The Hakkenden (1990) (Inukai Genpachi Nobumichi)
Cosmo Warrior Zero (2001) (Tochirō)

Animated films
Anpanman movie series (xxxx) (SLman (2nd voice), SLmanman, Hōtaiman, Super Kabidandan)
Dorami-chan: Wow, The Kid Gang of Bandits (1991) (Chibisuke)
Fatal Fury: The Motion Picture (1994) (Billy Kane)
Konjiki no Gash Bell!!: 101 Banme no Mamono (2004) (Owl Demon)
Lupin III: The Plot of the Fuma Clan (1987) (Policeman)
My Neighbor Totoro (1988) (Postal worker)

Tokusatsu
Chouriki Sentai Ohranger (xxxx) (Cat Signal)
Gekisou Sentai Carranger (xxxx) (ZZ Zeri)

Videogames
Samurai Shodown: Warriors Rage (1999) (Haito Kanakura)
Daemon X Machina (2019) (Klondike)
unknown date
3×3 Eyes: Kyūsei Kōshu (Haslett Hearn, Naparuba)
3×3 Eyes: Tenrin-Ō Genmu (Haslett Hearn)
GioGio's Bizarre Adventure (Pesci, Ghiaccio)
Ninety-Nine Nights (Levv)
Kuma no Pūtarō: Sora wa Pink da! Zen'in Shūgō (Sore Damessu!) (Karaoke Monkey)
Shadow Hearts: Covenant (Joachim Valentine)
Shadow Hearts: From The New World (Joachim Valentine)

Live-action
The Red Spectacles (Chinpira)

Dubbing roles

Live-action
The Nutty Professor (Reggie Warrington (Dave Chappelle))

Animation
Tom and Jerry: The Magic Ring (Butch Alley Cat)
Thomas & Friends (Freddie)

References

External links

1961 births
Living people
Japanese male singer-songwriters
Japanese singer-songwriters
Japanese male video game actors
Japanese male voice actors
Male voice actors from Hokkaido
People from Asahikawa
81 Produce voice actors